Diving was contested at the 1982 Asian Games in Talkatora Swimming Pool, New Delhi, India from 24 November to 29 November 1982.

Medalists

Men

Women

Medal table

References

External links
Asian Games medalists
Women's Platform Results
Men's Platform Results
Women's Springboard Results
Men's Springboard Results

 
1982 Asian Games events
1982
Asian Games
1982 Asian Games